Nam Jin (born September 27, 1946) is a South Korean trot singer. He debuted in 1965 with the album Seoul Playboy, and became one of South Korea's most popular singers of the 1960s and 1970s.

Biography

Early life
Nam Jin was born Kim Nam-jin in 1946 in Mokpo, South Jeolla Province, South Korea. His father Kim Moon-ok, was a publisher for Mokpo Daily, and was a notable figure for the opposition as a member of parliament, which made his family rich.
His mother was Jang Gi-soon.

1960s
Originally Nam wanted to be an actor, but he trained in Han Dong-hoon's music academy for two years. Han eventually produced Nam's pop debut album Seoul playboy which was released in 1965 and failed commercially. After moving to oasis records, his 2nd album "Did I come here to cry?" became a huge hit. Since 1967 he also started his acting career with the 1967 film Heartbreaking. His film Longing Is Every Heart attracted 100,000 audiences in theaters. In 1968 he enlisted in the Blue Dragon Korean Marine Corp for the Vietnam War.

1970s
He discharged from the military in 1971. His 1972 single "Together with My Lover" became a huge hit, which was pop. He married with singer Yoon Bok-hee in 1976.

1980s
Nam was suppressed by the government and was limited of his career in the 1980s. He immigrated to America and went back to South Korea in 1982 releasing "Empty Cup".

2000s 
He often appears on the KBS 1TV Golden Oldies.

Filmography

Television shows

Ambassadorship 
 Hwasun-gun's public relations ambassador (2022)

Awards

Korean Popular Culture and Arts Awards

MBC Ten Singers Match

TBC Broadcast Music Awards

References 

1946 births
Living people
Trot singers
South Korean male film actors
South Korean television personalities
Korean military personnel of the Vietnam War
Republic of Korea Marine Corps personnel
People from Mokpo
Hanyang University alumni
21st-century South Korean male singers